People Will Talk is a 1951 American romantic comedy/drama film directed by Joseph L. Mankiewicz and produced by Darryl F. Zanuck from a screenplay by Mankiewicz, based on the German play by Curt Goetz, which was made into a movie in Germany (Doctor Praetorius, 1950). Released by Twentieth Century Fox, it stars Cary Grant and Jeanne Crain, with supporting performances by Hume Cronyn, Finlay Currie, Walter Slezak and Sidney Blackmer.

It was nominated for the Writers Guild of America screen Award for Best Written American Comedy (Joseph L. Mankiewicz).

Plot

Dr. Noah Praetorius is a physician who teaches in a medical school and founded a clinic dedicated to treating patients humanely and holistically. A colleague who dislikes Praetorius's unorthodox but effective methods, Dr. Rodney Elwell, has hired a detective to investigate Praetorius. A housemaid who once worked for Praetorius reacts visibly when Elwell asks her about Praetorius's mysterious friend Mr. Shunderson, who rarely leaves Praetorius's side and has a deep, intuitive understanding of human and animal nature.

Meanwhile, student Deborah Higgins enters Praetorius's life, displaying signs of emotional distress. After she faints during a lecture, Praetorius examines her and informs her that she's pregnant. Upset by this news, "Mrs. Higgins" admits that she's not really married. She will not reveal who the unborn child’s father is, and says knowing about her condition would be too much for her own father to bear. In a hallway near Praetorius's office, she shoots herself.

After successfully operating on Deborah, Praetorius tries to calm her by telling her there was a mistake in her pregnancy test, but she has fallen in love with him, and becomes upset at her own embarrassing behavior.  She runs away from the clinic, forcing him to find her so he can tell her she really is pregnant.

Praetorius and Shunderson drive out to where Deborah and her father Arthur live, a farm owned by Arthur's brother, John.Arthur thinks that his daughter burned herself with a curling iron. Deborah and Praetorius hide Deborah's shooting incident from her father, who is a failure in life and lives unhappily as a dependent of his stingy brother. Deborah is his only pride in life, which might become intolerable for him with a baby to take care of and his daughter's reputation ruined.

While showing Praetorius the farm, Deborah admits her love for him. She also wonders why he is visiting and begins to suspect that he is attracted to her. After she seductively interrogates him, they share a passionate kiss. They soon get married, and Arthur comes to live with them. Deborah goes to the store in order to buy her husband an electric train set and a birthday cake for his birthday.A few weeks later, Deborah suggests to Noah that she may be pregnant, and he admits that she was pregnant all along.They debate over the due date of the baby. Her husband says September and she says December. She ruefully concludes that he married her out of pity, but he convinces her that he really did fall in love with her. 

Elwell's detective discovers that Shunderson was once convicted of murder, and Elwell calls for a misconduct hearing against Praetorius. A photographer takes a picture of Saunderson. Saunderson confides with doctor Praetorius about the photographer. Professor Elwell pays doctor Praetorius a visit. Instead Deborah answers the door. The professor congratulates Deborah on her being newly married. He requests to meet with her husband concerning confidential information. Deborah confronts him about the vicious gossip concerning her husband. 

A hearing is held regarding charges against Dr. Praetorius.  At the hearing, Praetorius explains that he started his career in a small town by opening a butcher shop as a front for his undeclared medical practice, because the people of the town didn't trust doctors. Elwell accuses Praetorius of "quackery", but Praetorius defends himself with the fact that he was a licensed practitioner, describing how he was forced to leave town after his maid discovered his medical degree.

Praetorius refuses to answer questions about Shunderson, but Shunderson explains that he served 15 years in prison for the alleged death of a man who had tried to murder him, then somehow survived being hanged after actually murdering the man, who had gone into hiding during the first trial. When he woke up, he was lying on a table in front of Praetorius, who was at that time a medical student examining what he believed was a cadaver. Praetorius kept Shunderson's survival a secret, and Shunderson became Praetorius's devoted friend. After this story is told, the chairman concludes the hearing in Praetorius's favor, and Elwell walks away alone and discredited.

Elwell had purposefully arranged for Praetorius's misconduct hearing to be scheduled for the same time as the student/faculty orchestra's concert. After the hearing and Praetorius' acquittal, the film ends with Deborah, her father, and Shunderson in the audience watching Praetorius' good friend and confidant, physics professor Lyonel Barker, play in the orchestra while Praetorius conducts it in the finale of Brahms's Academic Festival Overture, "Gaudeamus Igitur".

Cast

 Cary Grant as Dr. Noah Praetorius
 Jeanne Crain as Deborah Praetorius
 Finlay Currie as Shunderson
 Hume Cronyn as Prof. Rodney Elwell
 Walter Slezak as Prof. Lyonel Barker
 Sidney Blackmer as Arthur Higgins
 Basil Ruysdael as Dean Lyman Brockwell
 Katherine Locke as Miss James
 Parley Baer as Toy Store Salesman (uncredited)
 Bess Flowers as Concert audience member (uncredited)
 Margaret Hamilton as Sarah Pickett, the housekeeper (uncredited)
 Stuart Holmes as Board member (uncredited)
 Jack Kelly as Student in classroom (uncredited)
 Will Wright as John Higgins (uncredited)

Reception
On August 30, 1951,  The New York Times praised the film in a long review, predicting the kind of acclaim received by the producers' previous hit, All About Eve. “For this merry melange of medicine, mystery and what must be the Mankiewicz philosophical code takes itself seriously but not so seriously as to avoid injecting as many chuckles as possible within the framework of an adult story… Using a script which is as sharp as a scalpel… the scenarist-director is relating the story of a strange, handsome medico a doctor who is not content to diagnose and cure but one who knows there is a vast difference between that concept and his duty which is ‘to make sick people well’….But a synopsis is merely a bare and unflattering skeleton. It does not reveal that Mr. Mankiewicz and crew are railing against callousness in medicine, that ‘the human body is not necessarily the human being.’ …Cary Grant.. is obviously having the time of his life playing Dr. Prateorius…his portrayal is an effective mixture of medicine and merriment. …Despite the fact that Mr. Mankiewicz' script is in error sometimes—atomic scientists are using atomic energy to make people well—it does make its points clearly and with humor. …(the film) does have something to say and it does so with erudition and high comedy, a compound that is vastly entertaining and rewarding."

Political overtones
A review at the Films de France website postulates that the movie is a reaction to "Mankiewicz’s own experiences during the McCarthyist Communist witch hunts of the late 1940s and early 1950s, while he was president of the Directors Guild of America (1950-51)".

The film's investigative trial parallels hearings by anti-Communist crusaders in the U.S. Congress. Just as some there refused to name names, Cary Grant's lead character declines to clear his own name by revealing the private business of another person, in this case a convicted murderer.

The review further advanced that the movie deals with many other issues, including the pregnancy of a single woman, the "corrosive effect of unfettered capitalism, the human cost of the Korean war, among others."

Music
The film's score consists of two classical pieces: Johannes Brahms' Academic Festival Overture and Richard Wagner's Prize Song, adapted and conducted by Alfred Newman.

References

External links
 
 
 
 
 

1951 films
1951 romantic comedy films
20th Century Fox films
American romantic comedy films
American black-and-white films
1950s English-language films
Films scored by Alfred Newman
Films directed by Joseph L. Mankiewicz
Films shot in New Jersey
American films based on plays
Films based on works by Curt Goetz
Medical-themed films
American remakes of German films
Films with screenplays by Joseph L. Mankiewicz
Films produced by Darryl F. Zanuck
American romantic comedy-drama films
1950s romantic comedy-drama films
1950s American films